Peñaranda is a Spanish surname . Notable people with the surname include:

Adalberto Peñaranda (born 1997), Venezuelan footballer
Alejandro Peñaranda (1993–2018), Colombian footballer
César Peñaranda (1915–2007), Peruvian cyclist
Enrique Peñaranda (1892–1969), Bolivian general and politician
Florentino Peñaranda (1876–1938), Filipino educator and politician
Francisco Armero Peñaranda (1804-1866), Spanish general and politician
Iván Peñaranda (born 1981), Spanish footballer
Jairo Penaranda (born 1958), Colombian gridiron football player
Luis Reyes Peñaranda (1911–?), Bolivian footballer
Raúl Peñaranda (born 1966), Bolivian journalist and political analyst
Raúl Peñaranda (footballer) (born 1991), Colombian footballer